The Judsonia Bridge is a historic bridge, carrying Van Buren Street (County Road 66) across the Little Red River on the south side of Judsonia, Arkansas. It and the two approach trusses are all Warren trusses. Built in 1924, it is one of three known swing bridges in the state, and the only one with a cantilevered swinging truss. It was closed to traffic in 2007, and reopened in 2013 after restoration.

The bridge was listed on the National Register of Historic Places in 1990.

See also
List of bridges documented by the Historic American Engineering Record in Arkansas
List of bridges on the National Register of Historic Places in Arkansas
National Register of Historic Places listings in White County, Arkansas

References

External links

Road bridges on the National Register of Historic Places in Arkansas
Bridges completed in 1924
Swing bridges in the United States
Historic American Engineering Record in Arkansas
National Register of Historic Places in White County, Arkansas
Judsonia, Arkansas
Cantilever bridges in the United States
Metal bridges in the United States
Warren truss bridges in the United States
1924 establishments in Arkansas
Transportation in White County, Arkansas
Little Red River (Arkansas)